Whiterow is a small coastal hamlet, on the east coast of Caithness, lying 1 mile southeast of Wick, Scottish Highlands. It is in the Scottish council area of Highland. It lies within the Civil Parish of Wick.

References

Populated places in Caithness